Zorica Mitov (Serbian Cyrillic: Зорицa Митов, born 17 March 1987) is a Serbian female basketball player.

External links
Profile at eurobaksket.com

1987 births
Living people
People from Vršac
Serbian expatriate basketball people in Bosnia and Herzegovina
Serbian expatriate basketball people in Germany
Serbian expatriate basketball people in Italy
Serbian expatriate basketball people in Romania
Serbian women's basketball players
Power forwards (basketball)
Centers (basketball)
ŽKK Vršac players